Kedar Nath Singh may refer to:

 Kedar Nath Singh (Bihar politician) (born 1969)
 Kedar Nath Singh (Uttar Pradesh politician)
 Kedarnath Singh (1934–2018), Indian poet